The 1978 Crispa Redmanizers season was the fourth season of the franchise in the Philippine Basketball Association (PBA). Known as Crispa 400s starting the 2nd conference.

Colors
Crispa Redmanizers (All-Filipino Conference)   (dark)   (light)Crispa 400 (Open and Invitational Conferences)   (dark)   (light)

Finals stint
Crispa stood firm to defend its last crown in the Open Conference with the All-Filipino unsuccessfully defended when they surprisingly faltered in the second round of the semifinals and were ousted by arch rival Toyota.

Coach Baby Dalupan personally choose 6-9 Ansley Truitt and 6-8 Paul Mills for their two imports. U-Tex and Crispa advanced to the semifinals without much difficulty and placed first and second after the semifinal round to enter into the championship. Unlike their last year's confrontation, the 400s were underdog for the first time in the title series and matched against the Wranglers' triumvirate of Glenn McDonald, Byron "Snake" Jones and Lim Eng Beng. Crispa were swept in three games by U-Tex.

Roster

References

External links
The Crispa files@freedarko.com

Crispa Redmanizers seasons
Crispa